Helium Vola is a studio album by the electronic band Helium Vola. It was released in October 2001 through Chrom Records. The album was re-released with the bonus CD Omnis Mundi Creatura on March 15, 2003.

Track listing
 "Funerali" – 0:55
 "Les Habitants Du Soleil" – 3:39
 "Omnis Mundi Creatura" – 6:04
 "Begirlich In Dem Hertzen Min" – 4:41
 "Je Chante Par Couverture" – 5:12
 "Fama Tuba" – 4:34
 "Lösespruch" – 3:14
 "Sancte Sator" – 5:25
 "Du Bist Min" – 5:05
 "Du Tagte Ez" – 5:03
 "Les Habitants Du Soleil (Reprise)" – 4:13
 "Luvenes" – 1:10
 "Selig" – 8:17

Omnis Mundi Creatura Bonus CD
 "Omnis Mundi Creatura (Album Version)" – 6:06
 "Minne Und Treue" – 4:44
 "Fama Tuba" – 4:36
 "Omnis Mundi Creatura (Radio Version)" – 4:09

Credits
Artwork by, photography – TBA, Tim Becker Artwork
Composed by Ernst Horn (tracks: 1 to 3, 5 to 14)
Fiddle, Cornet, Oboe [Shawm] – Jan Harrison
Harp – Uschi Laar
Hurdy-gurdy – Riccardo Delfino
Keyboards, music by – Ernst Horn
Lyrics by Traditional (tracks: 3, 4, 6 to 10)
Mastered by Christoph Stickel
Other [Realization] – Carl D. Erling
Producer – Ernst Horn
Vocals – Sabine Lutzenberger, Susan Weiland

External links 

2001 albums
Helium Vola albums